Kasiano may refer to:
Sam Kasiano, a New Zealand rugby league footballer
Kasiano "Kas" Lealamanua, a Samoan rugby union footballer